Kanchi Kalyanasundaram was an Indian politician. He was a Member of Parliament, representing Tamil Nadu in the Rajya Sabha the upper house of India's Parliament as a member of the Dravida Munnetra Kazhagam.

References

Rajya Sabha members from Tamil Nadu
Dravida Munnetra Kazhagam politicians
1909 births
1982 deaths